Seán Dolan's GAC is a Gaelic Athletic Association club based in Derry, County Londonderry, Northern Ireland. The club is a member of the Derry GAA and currently cater for Gaelic football and Ladies' Gaelic football.

Underage teams up to Under-12's play in North Derry league and championships, from Under-14 upwards teams compete in All-Derry competitions.

Gaelic football
Seán Dolans fields Gaelic football teams at Under 8, Under 10, Under 12, Under 14, Under 16, Minor and Senior levels. They currently compete in the Derry Junior Football Championship and the Junior All-County Football League.

Ladies' Gaelic football
The club also field Ladies' football teams at various age-groups.

History
The club are named after IRA member Séan Dolan. He was active in the IRA during the Northern Campaign. A fluent Irish speaker and keen traditional musician, Dolan was interned and imprisoned on a number of occasions for his activities in support of a United Ireland.

While holding the position of secretary of the Derry City Board, he was instrumental in the establishment of the Pearse's GAA club on the Waterside and played for them on numerous occasions. Seán Dolan died in the Waterside Hospital on 25 October 1941 at the age of 28. Fr F O'Hagan said at his funeral "He was a man of ideals and principles and he was prepared to suffer for those ideals he held in high honour". Seán Dolan's GAC was set up the following year in his honour.

In 2000 the club became the first Junior club to be awarded All-Ireland Club of the Year. In 2002 Séan Dolans GAC also won Derry Club of the Year.

Honours

Senior
 Neil Carlin Cup 5
 1987, 2006, 2009,2012,2021
 Derry Junior Football League 1
 2009
 Derry Junior Football Championship 1
 2009

Under-16
 North Derry Under-16 Football Championship:  *2000
 North Derry Under-16 'B' Football Championship:
 *2005
All County u16 ‘C’ league winners
2012

———under 13——-  
All county B2 league winners 2022

LADIES FOOTBALL 

U14 County  B Shield winners 2020
U15 County  B Shield winners 2021

* 

Note: The above lists may be incomplete. Please add any other honours you know of.

See also
List of Gaelic games clubs in Derry

External links
Seán Dolans GAC website

References

Gaelic games clubs in County Londonderry
Gaelic football clubs in County Londonderry
Gaelic Athletic Association clubs established in 1942